The 1964 season was the Hawthorn Football Club's 40th season in the Victorian Football League and 63rd overall.

Fixture

Premiership season

Night series cup

Ladder

References

Hawthorn Football Club seasons